Instrumentation is the art and science of measurement and control.

Instrumentation may also refer to:

Science and technology
 Instrumentation (computer programming), the ability to monitor a product's performance and to diagnose errors
 Virtual instrumentation
 Instrumentation amplifier, an integrated circuit sometimes used in measurement instruments
 Instrumentation, in the internal validity of the scientific study

Other
 Instrumentation (music)

See also
 Instrument (disambiguation)